Giralda ou La nouvelle psyché is an opéra comique with music by Adolphe Adam and a text by Eugène Scribe. It had its first performance at the Opéra-Comique theatre, Paris, on 20 July 1850.

Roles

Synopsis

The pious Queen of Spain, accompanied by her husband, is on a pilgrimage to Santiago de Compostela. They stop for the night along the way at the cottage of Ginès, a miller, whose wedding day it is. He is to be the bridegroom of Giralda, who however regrets her impending marriage as she has fallen in love with a knight whose name she does not know but who she has seen many times in the vicinity. This is Don Manoël, who bribes Ginès, who really only wants to marry Giralda for her dowry, with twice the sum he is expecting, to take his place at the marriage altar. When he learns that the royal couple has arrived however, Don Manoël, who has committed a political crime and must stay incognito, runs away.  While he is gone, Giralda believes herself married in turn to Ginès and an elderly gentleman, Don Japhet. Eventually Don Manoël returns, the Queen pardons his political offence, and he can pronounce himself the happy husband of Giralda.

Music

The overture contains a lively fandango and there is a chorus in the first act accompanied by castanets, giving local Spanish colour. The music throughout the piece is notable for its verve and charm.

Performance history

The title role was performed at the premiere by Marie Caroline Miolan-Carvalho. The work was a great success at its first performance  and remained in the repertoire of European theatres for many years. It was presented in English adaptations in London as "Giralda, or The Invisible Husband" in 1850,in the same year in London as "Giralda, or the Miller's Wife" and as "Giralda, or, Which Is My Husband?" also in 1850.

Notes

External links
 Giralda, ou La Nouvelle Psyché, opéra comique, 3 acts, 1850 publication, French, digitized by BYU on archive.org

Operas by Adolphe Adam
Libretti by Eugène Scribe
French-language operas
Opéras comiques
1850 operas
Operas
Opera world premieres at the Opéra-Comique